Qazi Mohib (15 August 1963 – 29 December 1996) was a Pakistani field hockey player . He played 123 matches and scored 41 goals for his country . He competed in the men's tournament at the 1988 Summer Olympics.

References

External links
 

1963 births
1996 deaths
Pakistani male field hockey players
Olympic field hockey players of Pakistan
Field hockey players at the 1988 Summer Olympics
People from Bannu District
Asian Games medalists in field hockey
Asian Games gold medalists for Pakistan
Asian Games silver medalists for Pakistan
Medalists at the 1986 Asian Games
Medalists at the 1990 Asian Games
Field hockey players at the 1986 Asian Games
Field hockey players at the 1990 Asian Games
20th-century Pakistani people